John F. Shea Jr. (September 11, 1928 – May 10, 2013) was an American businessman, jurist, and politician.

Born in Manchester, Connecticut, Shea graduated from Providence College. He then received his law degree from University of Connecticut School of Law and practiced law in Manchester, Connecticut. He served in the Connecticut House of Representatives 1961-1962 as a Republican. In 1973, Shea was appointed Connecticut Superior Court judge serving until 1980 when he resigned to work for Aetna Life and Casualty.

Notes

1928 births
2013 deaths
People from Manchester, Connecticut
Providence College alumni
University of Connecticut School of Law alumni
Connecticut lawyers
Businesspeople from Connecticut
Connecticut state court judges
Republican Party members of the Connecticut House of Representatives
20th-century American businesspeople
20th-century American judges
20th-century American lawyers